Cukalat is a village and a former municipality in Berat County, central Albania. At the 2015 local government reform it became a subdivision of the municipality of Dimal. The population at the 2011 census was 3,045.

Localities
 Donofrosë
 Slanicë
 Cukalat
 Allambres
 Krotinë
 Çetë

References

Former municipalities in Berat County
Administrative units of Dimal, Albania
Villages in Berat County
Populated places disestablished in 2015